The Science of Patterns is the first EP by Tycho, self-published in 2002 as a four-track disc. The digital media reissue—made available in 2007—also included a bonus fifth track.

Track listing

External links
 

Ambient albums by American artists
2002 EPs